Charles Boyd Hare (16 March 1870 – 10 August 1947) was an English professional footballer who played in the Football League for Aston Villa, Woolwich Arsenal and Small Heath in the 1890s. An inside forward or centre forward, he also represented Watford and Plymouth Argyle in the Southern League.

Life and career
Born in Ladywood, Birmingham, Hare played in the Football League in the 1890s for Aston Villa, contributing to their first league title in the 1893–94 season. He was transferred to Woolwich Arsenal in February 1895 and made his debut for the Second Division side on 9 March 1895 against Leicester Fosse, which ended as a 3–3 draw. In one-and-a-half seasons at the club he was in and out of the side, mainly playing at inside forward, although he also deputised for Joe Powell at right back.

With 20 appearances and 7 goals to his name for Woolwich Arsenal, in November 1896 he moved to Small Heath. He then played for Watford in the Southern League, and is joint holder of the club record for most FA Cup goals in a season, with seven in the 1899–1900 campaign. Hare served  in South Africa during the Boer War. On his return he tried to revive his career with Plymouth Argyle in the Southern League, but with little success, and he left the professional game in 1904.

He ran a hotel in Liskeard, Cornwall, before returning to Birmingham where he died in 1947.

Honours
Aston Villa
 Football League First Division champions: 1893–94

References

1870 births
1947 deaths
Footballers from Birmingham, West Midlands
English footballers
Association football forwards
Warwick County F.C. players
Aston Villa F.C. players
Arsenal F.C. players
Birmingham City F.C. players
Watford F.C. players
Plymouth Argyle F.C. players
English Football League players
Southern Football League players
British Army personnel of the Second Boer War
People from Ladywood